Irwin Redlener is an American pediatrician and public health activist who specializes in health care for underserved children and disaster planning, response, and recovery.  He is the author of The Future of Us: What the Dreams of Children Mean for 21st Century America (2017) and the author of Americans at Risk: Why We Are Not Prepared for Megadisasters and What We Can Do Now (2006).

Redlener is president emeritus and co-founder (with singer songwriter Paul Simon and Karen Redlener) of Children's Health Fund (CHF), director of the National Center for Disaster Preparedness at The Earth Institute at Columbia University, and Professor of Health Policy & Management and Professor of Pediatrics, Columbia University Medical Center.

Redlener was a special advisor to New York City Mayor Bill de Blasio, with a focus on emergency management and planning to support and advise the administration's citywide disaster preparedness and response efforts.

Background
Redlener was born in Brooklyn, New York.  He received his B.A. from Hofstra University in 1964 and his M.D. from the University of Miami in 1969.  In 1971, while a pediatric resident at University of Colorado Medical Center, Redlener left his program to serve as the medical director of an AmeriCorps VISTA health center in Lee County, Arkansas, the sixth poorest county in the U.S. During this time, he met his future wife, Karen, a VISTA volunteer who organized the region's first social services and child development program. The two have worked together since.

Career 
Redlener served as the director of the pediatric intensive care unit at Jackson Memorial Hospital, Miami, Florida.  He also worked on disaster relief efforts in Honduras and Guatemala, and created a new Child Action Center to study and treat child abuse. In 1979, after a brief stint in neonatal intensive care at Albert Einstein College of Medicine, he briefly worked as a community pediatrician in Utica, New York. He also served as chairman of the national executive committee of Physicians for Social Responsibility, a public health organization promoting prevention of nuclear war.

In 1985, Redlener joined the board of USA for Africa as the organization's medical director and director of grants, where he met Paul Simon. In 1987, Redlener, Paul Simon and Karen Redlener founded Children's Health Fund to provide health care to homeless and medically underserved children in New York City. The program began with a single mobile medical unit funded by Simon and designed by Karen Redlener. As of 2010, the organization had 23 programs with more than 50 mobile medical units in underserved rural and urban communities throughout the United States. Karen Redlener remains with the Fund, currently serving as the organization's chief administrative officer.

Redlener also served as head of outpatient pediatrics at Cornell/New York Hospital (1987–1990) and head of community pediatrics at Montefiore Medical Center (1990–2003). Redlener designed and oversaw development of the Children's Hospital at Montefiore and served as its president from 2001 to 2003.

During the 1992 presidential campaign, Redlener was chairman of the National Health Leadership Council, a group of 300 health professionals who supported Bill Clinton's candidacy. In 1993 and 1994, he was part of the White House Task Force on National Health Care Reform, serving as the vice-chairman of its Health Professional Review Group.  He was also a founding member of the Task Force on Terrorism of the American Academy of Pediatrics in 2001.

In April 2000, Redlener was engaged by Doris Meissner, Commissioner of the Immigration and Naturalization Service (INS), to provide strategic guidance regarding the management of the Elián González case. He claimed in a letter to INS that based on weeks of studying the case including a "propaganda 40-second video of 7-year-old Elian," he “is now in a state of imminent danger to his physical and emotional well-being in a home that I consider to be psychologically abusive.” He urged that the government immediately remove the "horrendously exploited” Elian from the “bizarre and destructive ambiance” of his Miami relatives and returned to his biological father. Eleven Cuban-American doctors dismissed Redlener's opinion for not “having obtained a medical history, performed a physical examination or other proper psychological evaluations of Elian." Redlener strongly refuted the premise of these assertions and suggested that his critics had no understanding of how to diagnose psychological child abuse. Republican National Committee Chairman Jim Nicholson said Redlener was "neither a psychiatrist nor a psychologist and who has never examined the young Cuban refugee."

In 2003, Redlener was recruited to the Mailman School of Public Health at Columbia University to establish the National Center for Disaster Preparedness (NCDP). Since 2003, Redlener has served as director of NCDP, working to improve public policy and resources, as well as citizens’ individual preparedness. In 2013, the NCDP moved from the Mailman School to join Columbia University's Earth Institute.

In May 2009, Redlener was appointed to the National Commission on Children and Disasters. In 2010, in part due to his research on the health effects of the Deepwater Horizon oil spill, the National Commission on the BP Deepwater Horizon Oil Spill and Offshore Drilling appointed Redlener to serve as the Commission's Special Consultant on Public Health.

On November 15, 2012, following Hurricane Sandy, New York Governor Andrew Cuomo appointed Redlener co-chair of the NYS Ready Commission, which was tasked with finding ways to ensure critical systems and services are prepared for future natural disasters and other emergencies.

On June 17, 2014, New York City Mayor Bill de Blasio named Redlener special advisor with a focus on emergency management and planning to support and advise the administration's citywide disaster preparedness and response efforts.

In 2020, Redlener and the singer Cher co-founded Cher Cares, a charity supporting disadvantaged communities affected by the COVID-19 pandemic.

In May 2020, Redlener said an effective COVID-19 vaccine would not be proven safe for at least another year. After distribution of a vaccine was authorized by the Food and Drug Administration in December 2020, Politico named Redlener's prediction one of "the most audacious, confident and spectacularly incorrect prognostications about the year."

As of 2020, Redlener is head of Columbia University's Pandemic Resource and Response Initiative.

Redlener is co-founder of the Ukraine Children's Action Project (UCAP), which was founded in May 2022 in response to the displacement of children and families consequent of the Russian invasion of Ukraine. UCAP focuses on supporting the educational continuity and mental health of displaced children in Ukraine and Poland.

See also
 List of TED speakers

References

External links
 
 Irwin Redlener: How to survive a nuclear attack (TED 2008)
 Columnist, The Daily Beast 

Activists from New York (state)
American health activists
American public health doctors
Columbia University faculty
Hofstra University alumni
Living people
People from Brooklyn
Leonard M. Miller School of Medicine alumni
Year of birth missing (living people)